Antioquian may refer to any of several extinct and poorly attested or unattested languages of the Santa Fe de Antioquia region of Colombia.  The languages were not necessarily related to each other.  Languages, dialects, and ethnic names lumped under the term include:

Old Catio (Chibchan)
Nutabe (Nutabane; Chibchan)
Anserma (Anserna, Ancerma; a.k.a. Humbra/Umbra; dialects Caramanta & Cartama. Chocoan.)
Arma-Pozo (dialects Arma, Pozo)
Avurrá (Aburra; 1 word known, possibly Chibchan)
Yamesí (no data)
Guazuzú
Buritaca
Abibe
Pequi
Hevejico
Amachi
Guamoco
Tahami
Oromina (a.k.a. Zeremoe)

References

Extinct languages of South America
Unclassified languages of South America